Bagavan (also spelled Bagawan) was an ancient locality in the central part of Armenia in the principality of Bagrevand. The site is located in the village of Taşteker to the west of modern Diyadin, Turkey. Situated on a tributary of the Euphrates at the foothills of Mount Npat, to the north of Lake Van, Bagavan held one of the major temples of pre-Christian Armenia. After the Christianization of Armenia, Bagavan became the site of a large church and monastery. Pillaged in 1877 by the Kurds, it was completely destroyed after 1915 during the Armenian genocide.

Name
The name Bagavan literally translates as "town of the gods". The etymology was given by Agathangelos, who explained the word as being Parthian, the equivalent of Armenian dicʿ-awan. Movses Khorenatsi held it as bagnacʿn awan ("town of altars"). The name, written as *Bagauana, is recorded in Greek by Ptolemy as Sakauana. Bagavan was most likely connected with one of the Old Persian words for sanctuary, such as *bagina- or *bagastāna-.

History
Bagavan was the site of one of the most important shrines of pre-Christian Armenia, and an eternal flame was kept burning there. The royal family of Armenia celebrated the New Year's festival at Bagavan, on the first day of the first month (Nawasard) of the Armenian calendar. Bagavan was also a centre for the worship of Aramazd, the Armenian version of Ahura Mazda. Movses Khorenatsi attributed the foundation of the altar at Bagavan to "the last Tigran" and the establishment of the New Year festival to King Valarsaces; however, the modern scholar Robert H. Hewsen notes that these theories were probably Movses's own inventions. 

According to Agathangelos, Tiridates III of Armenia (287–330) and his court were baptized by Gregory the Illuminator at Bagavan in the Euphrates. Gregory reportedly founded the monastery of St. John the Baptist at Bagavan. The Turkish name of the town, Üç Kilise ("the three churches"), derives from this monastery. The Sasanian king (shah) Yazdegerd II (438–457) camped at Bagavan in 439 during his punitive campaign in Sasanian Armenia. 

In 587 during the reign of emperor Maurice, Bagavan and much of Armenia came under Roman administration after the Romans defeated the Sassanid Persian Empire at the battle of the Blarathon.

Bagavan's St. John the Baptist church was completed in 631–639 on the left bank of the Euphrates river. Hewsen notes that it was originally surrounded by a "high wall flanked with towers which protected the monasting buildings within". In 1877, it was ransacked by Kurds before being completely demolished after 1915 during the Armenian genocide.

Notes

References

Sources
 
 
 
 
 

Armenian Apostolic churches in Turkey
Christian monasteries established in the 4th century
Former buildings and structures in Turkey
Former religious buildings and structures in Turkey
Destroyed churches in Turkey
Buildings and structures in Ağrı Province
Demolished buildings and structures in Turkey
1915 disestablishments in the Ottoman Empire
Buildings and structures demolished in 1915
Churches destroyed by Muslims
Armenian buildings in Turkey
Zoroastrianism
History of Ağrı Province
Ancient Armenia